Shermans Corner is a populated place in Angora Township, Saint Louis County, Minnesota, United States.

It is located five miles south of Cook at the junction of U.S. Highway 53, Minnesota Highway 1, and Saint Louis County Road 22.

Sherman Corner is adjacent to Angora.

References

 Official State of Minnesota Highway Map – 2011/2012 edition

Populated places in St. Louis County, Minnesota